Old Mother Riley at Home is a 1945 British comedy film directed by Oswald Mitchell and starring Arthur Lucan, Kitty McShane and Freddie Forbes. It is the 11th film in the long-running Old Mother Riley series.

Plot summary
Mother Riley's daughter Kitty has run off with her new and (so says Mother Riley), "no good" boyfriend. With the aid of Kitty's true love Dan, Mother Riley tracks the runaways and discovers them in a gambling den.

Cast
 Arthur Lucan - Mrs Riley
 Kitty McShane - Kitty Riley
 Freddie Forbes - Mr Bumpton
 Richard George - Dan
 Willer Neal - Bill
 Wally Patch - Bouncer
 Kenneth Warrington - Boss
 Angela Barrie - Duchess
 Janet Morriso - Mary
 Elsie Wagstaff - Mrs. Ginochie
 Henry B. Longhurst - Commissionaire

Critical reception
TV Guide called the film "one of the weaker series entries."

References

External links
 

1945 films
Films directed by Oswald Mitchell
1945 comedy films
British comedy films
British black-and-white films
Films scored by Percival Mackey
Films shot at British National Studios
1940s English-language films
1940s British films